PP-15 Rawalpindi-IX is a Constituency of Provincial Assembly of Punjab.

2008—2013: PP-10 (Rawalpindi-X)

2013—2018: PP-10 (Rawalpindi-X)
General elections were held on 11 May 2013. Malik Iftikhar Ahmad won this seat with 42539 votes.

All candidates receiving over 1,000 votes are listed here.

2018—2023 PP-15 (Rawalpindi-X)
From 2018 PP-10 (Rawalpindi-X) Become PP-15 (Rawalpindi-X) With Some changes has follow (a) The following Census Charges of Rawalpindi Cantonment (1) Charge No.1 (2) Charge No.2 (3) Charge No.3 Circle No. 1, 2 and 3 (4) Charge No.7 and (5) Charge No.8 of Rawalpindi District.

See also
 PP-14 Rawalpindi-VIII
 PP-16 Rawalpindi-X

References

External links
 Election commission Pakistan's official website
 Awazoday.com check result
 Official Website of Government of Punjab

R